Quality Street  is a 1927 American silent romance film directed by Sidney Franklin  and starring Marion Davies, Conrad Nagel and Helen Jerome Eddy. Produced by Cosmopolitan Productions for release through MGM, it was based on the 1901 play of the same name by James M. Barrie. Prints of this film are preserved at the Library of Congress and in the Turner Archive.

In 2002, the film was released on DVD by the Milestone Films and Video company releasing through Image Entertainment.

There was also a sound film version made in 1937, starring Katharine Hepburn.

Cast
Marion Davies as Phoebe Throssel
Conrad Nagel as Dr. Valentine Brown
Helen Jerome Eddy as Susan Throssel
Flora Finch as Mary Willoughby
Margaret Seddon as Nancy Willoughby
Marcelle Corday as Henrietta Turnbull
Kate Price as Patty

Production
In her 26th film, Marion Davies starred in this romantic drama as a young woman about to be married when the man (Conrad Nagel) suddenly goes off to war. Set during the Napoleonic Wars, Davies made her last silent "costume picture." She plays both Phoebe and (years later) the invented niece Livvy. This was only the second film in which Davies played an "old and faded" woman. The other was in The Young Diana. Davies won rave reviews, but the film was not a success. It earned the lowest gross receipts of all her MGM silent films.

See also
Quality Street (1937 film)
Quality Street (play)

References

External links

 lobby card to Quality Street
lobby card Quality Street

1927 films
American silent feature films
American black-and-white films
American films based on plays
Films based on works by J. M. Barrie
Metro-Goldwyn-Mayer films
Films set in the 1810s
Films set in England
1920s historical romance films
American historical romance films
Films directed by Sidney Franklin
1920s American films
1920s English-language films
Silent historical romance films